Gamochaeta stagnalis, the desert cudweed, is a species of flowering plant in the family Asteraceae. It is native to Mexico, Guatemala, and the southwestern United States (California, Arizona, New Mexico).

The plant forms many small flower heads in tightly packed clumps. Each head contains 3–4 purple disc flowers but no ray flowers.

Gamochaeta stagnalis is very similar to G. purpureum and some G. stagnalis specimens (especially from Arizona) have been misidentified as that species.

References

stagnalis
Flora of the Southwestern United States
Flora of Mexico
Flora of Guatemala
Plants described in 1923